Langarud or Langerud or Langrud or Lankarud or  Langrood may refer to:
 Langarud, a city in Gilan Province
 Langarud County, an administrative subdivision of Gilan Province
 Langerud, Markazi
 Langerud, Qom